Kenneth Hugh McCormack (28 August 1887 – 25 September 1943) was an English first-class cricketer.

McCormack was born in British India at Mazagaon in August 1887. He was educated in England at Dulwich College, where he played for the cricket eleven. Returning to India, he played first-class cricket for the Europeans cricket team on five occasions in the Bombay Quadrangular Tournament from 1914 to 1916. Playing as a batsman in the Europeans team, he scored 37 runs at an average of 12.33, with a highest score of 22 not out. He was employed in Bombay in the textile industry by Gaddum & Co. McCormack died at Bombay in September 1943.

References

External links

1887 births
1943 deaths
Cricketers from Mumbai
People educated at Dulwich College
English cricketers
Europeans cricketers